The Brno 2 Hours 30 Minutes was a sports car endurance race held at the Automotodrom Brno in Brno, Czech Republic.  The race was first held in 1988 as a round of the World Sportscar Championship.  It was revived in 1997 for the International Sports Racing Series, and continued until 2002 under the FIA Sportscar Championship. It has since been absorbed into the 24H Series, which in 2015 organised the Hankook 12 Hours Epilog of Brno, and in 2016 the Hankook 24 Hours Epilog of Brno. This was the first ever 24 hours endurance race in the Czech Republic.

Results

External links
Racing Sports Cars: Brno archive

 
Recurring sporting events established in 1988